Heather Watson is a professional tennis player who has been ranked as high as No. 38 in the WTA rankings.

Watson made her professional tennis debut on the ITF Women's Circuit at The Jersey International in 2009. She has reached one Grand Slam final, winning the mixed doubles at the 2016 Wimbledon Championships. So far in her career, Watson has won ten singles titles. This total includes four WTA Tour titles and six titles on the ITF Circuit. She also has won four doubles titles and the girls' singles title at the US Open.

Below is a list of career achievements and titles won by Heather Watson.

Career achievements
In 2012, Watson won her first WTA Tour titles, both in singles and doubles. With victories at the Bank of the West Classic and the Texas Tennis Open in women's doubles, as well as a singles victory at the HP Open, Watson became the first British woman to win a WTA title since Jo Durie in the 1990s. This also gave her career-high rankings in both variations of competition.

Performance timelines

Only main-draw results in WTA Tour, Grand Slam tournaments, Fed Cup/Billie Jean King Cup and Olympic Games are included in win–loss records.

Singles
Current after the 2023 ATX Open.

Doubles

Mixed doubles

Significant finals

Grand Slam tournaments

Mixed doubles: 2 (1 title, 1 runner-up)

WTA career finals

Singles: 5 (4 titles, 1 runner-up)

Doubles: 10 (4 titles, 6 runner-ups)

ITF Circuit finals

Singles: 11 (7 titles, 4 runner-ups)

Doubles: 6 (3 titles, 3 runner-ups)

Junior Grand Slam tournament finals

Singles: 1 title

Doubles: 1 (runner-up)

Fed Cup participation
Great Britain Fed Cup team. This table is current through the 2020–21 Billie Jean King Cup.

Singles: 33 (22–11)

Doubles: 11 (8–3)

Record against top 10 players
Watson's record against players who have been ranked in the top 10. Active players are in boldface.

Top 10 wins

Notes

References

External links
 
 
 

Tennis career statistics